The year 1966 in radio involved some significant events.

Events
 September: KWNT-FM signs on the air, simulcasting the AM signal of KWNT (1580 AM) and its country music format. Unlike the AM signal, which is daytime only, KWNT-FM's broadcast day goes to at least 10 p.m.
 September 16: WFIL 560 AM in Philadelphia changes from an MOR adult standard format to top 40 as "The Pop Explosion – Famous 56"
December 15 - WGIL-FM of Galesburg, Illinois signs on at 94.9 FM as sister station to WGIL-AM; by 1974, the station's call letters were changed to WAAG.

Debuts
May 3 – Swinging Radio England and Britain Radio commence broadcasting on AM, with a combined potential 100,000 watts, from the same ship anchored off the south coast of England in international waters.
October 22 – WJVM (94.3 FM) launches in Sterling, Illinois.

Births
 January 25 – Wes Durham, American sportscaster and radio play-by-play announcer for Georgia Tech sports.
 April 1 – Chris Evans, British radio disc jockey.
 April 23 – Bubba the Love Sponge, American radio personality.
 September 9 – Nikki Bedi, Anglo-Indian broadcast presenter.
 October 27 – Matt Drudge, American Internet journalist and talk radio host.

Deaths
 April 11 – A. B. Campbell, English naval officer and radio broadcaster (born 1881).
 December 2 – Giles Cooper, British broadcast dramatist (born 1918).

 
Radio by year